Squadron of Honor is a 1938 American action film directed by Charles C. Coleman and starring Don Terry, Mary Russell, and Thurston Hall. It was produced as a second feature by Columbia Pictures. The film's sets were designed by the art director Stephen Goosson.

Synopsis
American Legion commander Bob Metcalf and district attorney Don Blane join forces to battle a crooked operator who tries to frame Metcalf for murder. To assist him Blane calls on the help of a hundred thousand American Legion members.

Cast

 Don Terry as 	District Attorney Don Blane
 Mary Russell as Eve Rogers
 Thurston Hall as Bob Metcalf
 Arthur Loft as 	Lou Tanner
 Robert Warwick as 	Kimball
 Marc Lawrence as 	Lawlor
 Dick Curtis as 	Craig
 George McKay as 	Todd
 Eddie Fetherston as Denton
 Edward LeSaint as 	Forsythe
 Ivan Miller as Chief Finley
 Harry Strang as 	Capt. Riley
 Jimmy Hollywood as	Sid Hinkle
 Edward Earle as Haynes 
 Jack Pennick as 	Elmer
 Mary Mersch as 	Mrs. Gobel 
 John Ince as 	Legionnaire Commander 
 William Worthington as 	Major
 Edmund Cobb as Policeman
 Eddie Laughton as 	Bookie 
 George Chesebro as Legionnaire
 Tom London as 	Legionnaire

References

Bibliography
 Miller, Don. "B" Movies: An Informal Survey of the American Low-budget Film, 1933-1945. Curtis Books, 1973.

External links
Squadron of Honor at the Internet Movie Database

1938 films
American action films
1930s action films
Films directed by Charles C. Coleman
American black-and-white films
Columbia Pictures films
1930s English-language films
1930s American films